Oprah's Lifeclass is an American primetime self-help talk show hosted and produced by Oprah Winfrey, airing on OWN: Oprah Winfrey Network.

Series overview

Episodes

Season 1 Classes (2011)

Season One of Oprah's Lifeclass aired on OWN: Oprah Winfrey Network from Monday October 10 until Friday November 11, 2011. The first season of Lifeclass aired Monday-Friday at 8/7c, following The Rosie Show, and the pair was considered a reboot for the struggling network to increase viewership during its fall launch of shows. Season One consists of twenty-five hour-long episodes hosted by Winfrey, and nine 90-minute webcasts hosted by Winfrey and a guest teacher (some of which aired as Oprah's Lifeclass LIVE episodes, following Lifeclass on Friday nights).

Season 2 Classes (2012)- Oprah's Lifeclass: The Tour

Season Two of Oprah's Lifeclass aired weekly on OWN: Oprah Winfrey Network from Monday March 26 until Monday April 30, 2012. Winfrey hosted class discussions in various cities across North America, in an effort to better connect with the show's audience. Winfrey made tour stops in St. Louis, Missouri, New York City, New York, and Toronto, Ontario. The second season aired Mondays at 8/7c and consists of six two-hour episodes.

Season 3 Classes (2012-13)

Season Three of Oprah's Lifeclass premiered on OWN: Oprah Winfrey Network on Sunday July 29, 2012 at 10/9c. It features Winfrey hosting classes in front of a live studio audience at Harpo Studios in Chicago with various guest co-hosts. Some episodes of season three were filmed at The Hobby Center for the Performing Arts in Sarofim Hall in Houston, Texas on October 5, 2012 with Joel Osteen and Rick Warren. The third season aired Sundays at 9/8c or 10/9c and consists of seven hour-long episodes.

Season 4 Classes (2013)

Season Four of Oprah's Lifeclass premiered on OWN: Oprah Winfrey Network on Sunday February 10, 2013 at 9/8c. It features Winfrey hosting classes in front of a live studio audience at Harpo Studios in Chicago with various guest co-hosts, including Lifeclass mainstay Iyanla Vanzant, Gary Chapman, Brené Brown, and Dr. Phil. An episode featuring Bishop T.D. Jakes teaching a lesson about fatherless sons and daughters filmed in Texas in late August.

Season 5 Classes (2014)

Season Five of Oprah's Lifeclass premiered on OWN: Oprah Winfrey Network on Friday January 3, 2014 at 10/9c. It features Winfrey hosting classes in front of a live studio audience in "The Social Lab" at Harpo Studios in Chicago with various guest co-hosts.

Online Classes

References

Oprahs lifeclass